Jack Brammal, born John George Brammal, was an actor on stage and screen in the United States. He was born in England.

In 1909 he was in a Shubert production.

He joined David Miles at Kinemacolor in 1912. Also in 1912 he was part of The Screen Club. He attended a Screen Club party in 1913.

Filmography

Actor
A Case of Beans (1916)
 Macbeth (1916)
 The Wharf Rat (1916)
The Fatal Glass of Beer (1916 film)
Puppets (1916)
The House Built Upon Sand (1916)
Six Feet Four (1919)
Rose o' the River (1919)
The Master Man (1919)
Terror Island (1920), a film starring Harry Houdini
The Skywayman (1920)
The Cheater Reformed (1921)
Play Square (1921)

References

External links

Jack Brammall, Forgotten Man of Stage and Screen

20th-century American male actors
Year of death missing
1879 births
British emigrants to the United States